Bashtanka is a city in Mykolaiv Oblast, Ukraine. It is the administrative center of Bashtanka Raion. Bashtanka hosts the administration of Bashtanka urban hromada, one of the hromadas of Ukraine. Population:  In 2001, population was 13,146.

History
Bashtanka was granted urban-type settlement status in 1963.

During the 2022 Russian invasion of Ukraine, an 800 vehicle strong Russian Army convoy was ambushed and allegedly destroyed by Ukrainian aircraft near Bashtanka. On 20 April, a hospital was reportedly hit by a Russian missile.

References

Cities in Mykolaiv Oblast
Kherson Governorate
Cities of district significance in Ukraine
Populated places established in the Russian Empire
1806 establishments in the Russian Empire
1806 establishments in Ukraine